Benjamin Hundermark (born 7 June 1984) is a former Zimbabwean cricketer. A right-handed batsman and right-arm medium-fast bowler, he played two first-class matches for Manicaland during the 2004–05 Logan Cup.

References

External links
 
 

1984 births
Living people
Cricketers from Harare
Manicaland cricketers
Midlands cricketers
Zimbabwean cricketers